Condor is a hamlet in Alberta, Canada within Clearwater County.

The hamlet is located in census division No. 9 and in the federal riding of Wetaskiwin.  In 1938, they were still negotiating for a gravel road to their community.

The hamlet was named in tribute to the British Royal Navy ship .

Demographics 
Condor recorded a population of 99 in the 1991 Census of Population conducted by Statistics Canada.

Notable people 
Barry Mather, Canadian journalist and Member of Parliament (1968-1972)

See also 
List of communities in Alberta
List of hamlets in Alberta

References 

Clearwater County, Alberta
Hamlets in Alberta